Captionmax  is one of North America's largest closed captioning and media accessibility companies. The company is headquartered in Minneapolis, Minnesota, with additional locations in New York City, New York and Burbank, California. The company provides captions, subtitles, translation, video description, and as-broadcast scripts for over 450 customers including all major broadcast and cable TV networks, production companies, studios, distributors, educational institutions, government agencies, large corporations and Internet portals. Some clients include Warner Bros. Television (CW network productions), NBCUniversal (network productions), McGraw-Hill, Viacom Media Networks and Sony Pictures Entertainment.

On September 21, 2022, Captionmax was officially rebranded as 3Play Media.

History
Captionmax is a privately owned business. The company was founded in 1992 by Max Duckler. In the last 25 years, Captionmax has expanded from a small, one person shop to a company of over 100 employees and independent contractors working on a variety of accessible media services. Today, Captionmax owns buildings in both Minneapolis, MN and Glendale, CA. 

1993 - Captionmax gets its first captioning contract from Hazelden.
1995 - Captionmax partners with DCMP.
1996 - Captionmax wins its first cooperative agreement award to caption syndicated programming such as Hometime and Dukes of Hazzard.
1997 - Captionmax hosts its first Consumer Advisory Board Meeting.
2003 - Captionmax Video Description Department is added in-house.
2004 - Captionmax builds a new  facility in Burbank. The facility houses satellites, realtime operations, and the largest offline captioning staff in California.
2006 - Captionmax is awarded two 5-year Access to Emerging Technologies grants  from the U.S. Department of Education.
2007 - Captionmax builds a new  LEED certified headquarters in Minneapolis, MN.
2007 - Captionmax partners with the National Association of the Deaf to increase accessible media in the classroom.
2008 - Captionmax collaborated with NCSeT to research video description.
2009 - Captionmax partners with Discovery Education under a U.S. Department of Education grant to increase accessibility to educational media used in K-12 classrooms.
2010 - Captionmax awarded $2.5 million grant to provide video description.
2017 - Captionmax's leadership team led a management buyout
2018 - Captionmax received the "Eye on Impact" Award from CBS.
2021 - Captionmax acquired  in March.

Partnerships
In 2006 Captionmax entered the educational multimedia market. 

Captionmax authors hundreds of hours of accessible interactive educational materials used in K-12 classrooms across the country. This media contains enhancements, such as video description and captioned glossary terms, to help children on comprehension tests.

For the past 15 years, Captionmax has hosted a Consumer Advisory Board Meeting attended by Captionmax staff, business professionals in the accessibility world, teachers, and students. 

Captionmax also partners with DCMP to provide closed captions, subtitles, and video description to their library.

Research and development
In 2006, Captionmax was awarded 2 5-year Access to Emerging Technologies grants from the U.S. Department of Education. These grants enabled Captionmax to participate in research and development with other organizations, such as DCMP and Cued Speech Discovery and Information Services. 

In 2008, Captionmax collaborated with the National Center for Supported eText (NCSeT) in an initiative called The Supportive Video Project. The goal of this collaboration was to research enhanced video description options for educational learning.

See also
 Closed captioning
 Video description
 Subtitles

References

Psychology. (n.d.). In Wikipedia. Retrieved October 14, 2009, from https://assist-ny.com/Closed-Captioning-Services-New-York.php

External links

Mass media companies established in 1992
1992 establishments in Minnesota
2021 mergers and acquisitions
2022 mergers and acquisitions
Mass media companies of the United States
Companies based in Minneapolis
Deaf culture in the United States